John McMullen may refer to:

John McMullen (bishop) (1832–1883), first bishop of Davenport, Iowa
John McMullen (broadcaster), American radio and internet broadcaster
John McMullen (engineer) (1918–2005), engineer and owner of two sports teams
John McMullen (politician) (1843–1922), Wisconsin state senator
John K. McMullen, USAF officer
John A. McMullen (born 1941), Vermont businessman and political candidate

See also
John Mullen (disambiguation)
John J. McMullen & Associates, a naval architecture firm in the United States
Jack McMullen (born 1991), actor